The 1992 Kilkenny Intermediate Hurling Championship was the 28th staging of the Kilkenny Senior Hurling Championship since its establishment by the Kilkenny County Board.

On 18 October 1992, Young Irelands won the championship after a 2–12 to 1–07 defeat of Conahy Shamrocks in the final at Nowlan Park. It remains their only intermediate championship title.

Results

Final

References

Kilkenny Intermediate Hurling Championship